KTG may refer to:

 Keratinocyte transglutaminase, an enzyme
 Ketapang Airport, IATA code

kinetic theory of gases, in Physics